The 16th Annual Japan Record Awards took place at the Imperial Garden Theater in Chiyoda, Tokyo, on December 31, 1974, starting at 7:00PM JST. The primary ceremonies were televised in Japan on TBS.

Award winners

Japan Record Award
Shinichi Mori for "Erimo Misaki"
 Lyricist: Osami Okamoto
 Composer: Takuro Yoshida
 Arranger: Shunichi Makaino
 Record Company: JVC Victor

Best Vocalist
Hiroshi Itsuki for "Miren"

Best New Artist
Youko Aso for "Touhikou"

Vocalist Award
 Kenji Sawada for "Tsuioku"
 2nd time awarded after 2 years, 2nd vocalist award.
 Aki Yashiro for "Ai No Shuunen"
 Awarded again after last year, 2nd vocalist award.
 Hideki Saijo for "Kizudarake No Laura"
 Awarded again after last year, 2nd vocalist award.
 Akira Fuse for "Tsumiki No Heya"

General Public Award
 Momoe Yamaguchi for "Hito Natsu No Keiken"
 Tonosama Kings for "Namida No Misao"
 Michiyo Azusa for "Futari De Osake Wo"
 Kiyoshi Nakajyou for "Uso"

New Artist Award
 Tsutomu Arakawa for "Taiyō No Nichiyōbi" 
 Teresa Teng for "Kuukou"
 Mineko Nishikawa for "Anata Ni Ageru"
 Michiru Jo for "Iruka Ni Notta Shounen"
 Yūko Asano for "Koi Wa Dandan"

Composer Award
 Kyōhei Tsutsumi for "Amai Seikatsu"
 Singer: Goro Noguchi
 Awarded again after 3 years, 3rd composer award.

Arranger Award
 Katz Hoshi for "Yūdachi"
 Singer: Yōsui Inoue

Lyricist Award
 Masashi Sada for "Shourou Nagashi"
 Singer: Grape

Special Award
 Rikizou Taya 
Song: 'O sole mio
 Ichirō Fujiyama 
Song: Aoi Sanmyaku

Planning Award
 Yōsui Inoue & Polydor Records for "Kori No Sekai" 
 Kaientai & Elec Records for "Haha Ni Sasageru Ballad"

Young Idol Award
 Finger 5 for "Koi No American Football"

Shinpei Nakayama Award & Yaso Saijō Award
 Hiroshi Yokoi & Minoru Endou for "Shitamachi No Aoi Sora"
 Singer: Masako Mori
 Kazuya Senke & Tadashi Yoshida for "Kyo Goyomi ~ Souji Okita ~"
 Singer: Yukio Hashi

External links
Official Website

Japan Record Awards
Japan Record Awards
Japan Record Awards
Japan Record Awards
1974